Jonathan Rado is an American musician, record producer and engineer, best known as a multi-instrumentalist in the indie rock duo Foxygen. Rado is a native of Westlake Village, California, where he formed Foxygen with his classmate Sam France in 2005.

After releasing four albums with Foxygen, Rado began producing albums for other artists, including The Killers, The Lemon Twigs, Tim Heidecker, Whitney, Alex Cameron, Father John Misty and Weyes Blood. In 2018, Billboard called Rado "one of indie rock's most in-demand producers". Rolling Stone called him an "analog fetishist who's become a producer of choice for a particular breed of like-minded indie-pop artists."

Rado is married to singer-songwriter Jackie Cohen. He also appeared in a 2008 episode of the television series Weeds and a 2009 episode of the sitcom Community. Rado is of Hungarian descent. He studied screenwriting at the School of Visual Arts in New York.

Discography
Solo
Law and Order (2013)
Born to Run (2017)

with Foxygen
Jurrassic Exxplosion Phillipic (2007)
Take the Kids Off Broadway (2011)
We Are the 21st Century Ambassadors of Peace & Magic (2013)
...And Star Power (2014)
Hang (2017)
Seeing Other People (2019)

Credits

References

Living people
American rock guitarists
American multi-instrumentalists
American indie rock musicians
American record producers
American audio engineers
American people of Hungarian descent
People from Westlake Village, California
School of Visual Arts alumni
Year of birth missing (living people)